Madhuban is a neighbourhood in Jorhat city, Assam, India.

Madhuban may also refer to:

 Madhuban, Giridih, a village in Pirtand block, Giridih district, Jharkhand, India
 Madhuban, Dhanbad, a census town in Baghmara (community development block), Dhanbad district, India
 Madhuban, Bihar Assembly constituency
 Madhuban, Uttar Pradesh Assembly constituency